Strings to a Web is the 20th studio album by German heavy metal band Rage, released in Europe on 5 February 2010 through Nuclear Blast Records. The American and Japanese editions of the album were released in a special two-disc set, which included a DVD with live performances and videos.

Track listing

Bonus DVD

Personnel

Band members 
Peter "Peavy" Wagner – vocals, bass
Victor Smolski – guitars, keyboards, cello, producer, mixing, mastering, orchestral arrangements
André Hilgers – drums

Additional musicians 
Lingua Mortis Orchestra
Hansi Kürsch, Jen Majura, Thomas Hackmann – backing vocals
Samantha Pearl Hilgers – vocal screams on "Hellgirl"

Production 
Charlie Bauerfeind – producer, engineer, mixing, mastering
Thomas geiger – additional digital editing

References 

2010 albums
Rage (German band) albums
Nuclear Blast albums
Albums produced by Charlie Bauerfeind